Terminenzio is an Italian television series, a parody of Terminator films, appeared in Mai dire... TV transmission on Italia 1 in 2009.

See also
List of Italian television series

References

Italian television series